The  2014–15 season was the 44th season of competitive football for Universitatea Craiova, and the first season for a team from Craiova in Liga I since 2011. Universitatea Craiova were promoted to the top league of the Romanian football league system after winning the 2013–14 Liga II season (Seria II).

Previous season positions

Kit
Supplier: Joma / Sponsors: Sticky (back)

Universitatea Craiova signed a deal with manufacturer Joma after having used Macron in the previous season. The team presented the kit and the new signings on the 21st of June.

Home: The home kit is stripped and in the traditional blue and white colors. This kit used the stripped crest of the sports club until April, and then switched to the lion crest.
Away: The away kit was all white with blue trims on the shorts. This kit used the stripped crest for the entirety of the season.
Third: The third kit had the same design as the home kit, but in black and yellow colors. It was unpopular with the fans, who wanted their team to play in blue or in white, and was used only once.
Fourth: The fourth kit consisted of green shirts, black shorts and black socks. It was unpopular with the fans, who wanted their team to play in blue or in white, and was used only once.

Players

Squad information

Transfers

In

Loans in

Out

Loans out

Overall transfer activity

Expenditure

Income

Net Totals

Pre-season and friendlies

Competitions

Overview

Liga I

The Liga I fixture list was announced on 2 July 2014.

Universitatea Craiova started their league campaign against Pandurii Targu Jiu in a thrilling match that ended in a 1-1 draw. The game saw over 15,000 fans flock to the "Ion Oblemenco" stadium to support the home team. Both teams began the game with caution, but Universitatea quickly took charge of the game, with Curelea coming close to scoring in the 13th minute, but his lobbed shot missed the target. The rest of the half saw Universitatea control the game but unable to find the final pass. The second half saw Ferfelea and Curelea creating more chances, and Pleșan's entry at halftime energized the home team's attack. Against the run of play, Pandurii took the lead in the 75th minute, when Shalaj took advantage of a lack of synchronisation in Craiova's defense. Despite Curelea missing several chances, including one that hit the crossbar, he eventually found the back of the net in the 87th minute to level the score at 1-1.

In their next match against Steaua Bucharest, Universitatea Craiova put up a valiant effort but ultimately lost 3-1. The Craiova team played without Mateiu and Pleșan, who were injured, and manager Jerry Gane experimented with Madson and Nuno Rocha in midfield. Despite conceding a goal in the third minute, Universitatea attacked Steaua relentlessly, and Băluță's chance in the second half went begging. Steaua proved too experienced for the young Craiova team, and the game ended 3-1 in favor of the home team.

Universitatea Craiova faced Viitorul Constanta in their next game, which ended 2-2. The visitors took the lead from a penalty, but two Curelea goals before halftime put the home team in front. It was a tight game, and Mitrea's second-half free-kick equalized for Viitorul, with both teams creating chances to win in the closing stages. The point was well-deserved for the Craiova team, who showed their fighting spirit.

Liga I table

Results summary

Results by round

Matches

Cupa României

Universitatea Craiova entered the Romanian Cup at the Round of 32.

Their first opponents were second division side FC Caransebeș. Playing with several second string players, Craiova started the game brightly and missed two early chances. Ferfelea's free-kick almost hit the target and Herghelegiu was unable to tap in the ball from inside the six-yard box. In the 25th minute Ferfelea's cross-shot was deflected in the goal by Caransebeș defender Goşa, and Craiova opened the score. After the goal, Craiova's players relaxed and Lupu equalized after a hesitation from the central defenders. The Students were unfazed by the goal and continued to attack, but they were unable to find the net. The numerical equilibrium was broken after Lupu was sent off in the 67th minute. Soon after, Ferfelea received a pass in the middle of the penalty area and scored the winning goal.

In the Round of 16 Universitatea was drawn to play at home against Viitorul Constanța. Craiova created a few early chances through Băluță and Ferfelea, but they were unable to score. Viitorul replied through ex-Craiova player Neacșa, who escaped in a one on one situation with the goalkeeper, but his weak shot was unable to threaten the goal and the first half ended scoreless. Craiova started the second half on the offensive, and their efforts were rewarded when a Curelea volley was boxed by Viitorul's goalkeeper to Băluță, who scored from close range. Despite playing in 10 men after the sending off of Puțanu, Viitorul equalized in stoppage time after a corner and sent the game into extra-time. In the 97th minute, Craiova winger Bancu suffered a double leg fracture that sidelined him for most of the remaining of the season. Mateiu scored the winning goal in the 112th minute and sent Craiova through to the quarter-finals.

Cupa Ligii

Universitatea Craiova entered the League Cup at the Play-off round.

Statistics

Appearances and goals

Squad statistics
{|class="wikitable" style="text-align: center;"
|-
! style="background: #006cb5; color: white;"|
! style="width:70px;background: #006cb5; color: white;"|Liga I
! style="width:70px;background: #006cb5; color: white;"|Cupa României
! style="width:70px;background: #006cb5; color: white;"|Cupa Ligii
! style="width:70px;background: #006cb5; color: white;"|Home
! style="width:70px;background: #006cb5; color: white;"|Away
! style="width:70px;background: #006cb5; color: white;"|Total Stats
|-
|align=left|Games played       || 34 || 3 || 1 || 19 || 19 || 38
|-
|align=left|Games won          || 14 || 2 || 0 || 8 || 8 || 16
|-
|align=left|Games drawn        || 11 || 0 || 0 || 7 || 4 || 11
|-
|align=left|Games lost         || 9 || 1 || 1 || 4 || 7 || 11
|-
|align=left|Goals scored       || 40 || 4 || 0 || 21 || 23 || 44
|-
|align=left|Goals conceded     || 34 || 3 || 1 || 12 || 26 || 38
|-
|align=left|Goal difference    || +6 || +1 || -1 || +9 || -3 || +6
|-
|align=left|Clean sheets       || 13 || 0 || 0 || 9 || 4 || 13
|-
|align=left|Goal by Substitute || 3 || 0 || 0 || 1 || 2 || 3
|-
|align=left|Total shots        || 339 || 22 || 8 || 210 || 159 || 369
|-
|align=left|Shots on target    || 121 || 10 || 4 || 68 || 67 || 135
|-
|align=left|Corners            || 177 || 11 || 6 || 116 || 78 || 194
|-
|align=left|Players used       || 32 || 26 || 13 || 29 || 29 || 33
|-
|align=left|Offsides           || 91 || 2 || 1 || 41 || 53 || 94
|-
|align=left|Fouls suffered     || 537 || 22 || 17 || 285 || 291 || 576
|-
|align=left|Fouls committed    || 484 || 19 || 16 || 255 || 264 || 519
|-
|align=left|Yellow cards       || 67 || 2 || 5 || 28 || 46 || 74
|-
|align=left|Red cards          || 4 || 0 || 1 || 3 || 2 || 5
|-
|align=left|Average possession  || 48.97% || 21.0% || 60.0% || 50.0% || 44.11% || 47.05%
|-
|align=left|Winning rate       || 41.18% || 66.67% || 0.0% || 42.11% || 42.11% || 42.11%
|-

Goalscorers

{| class="wikitable" style="text-align:center;"
|-
! style="width:56px; background: #006cb5; color: white;" | Rank
! style="width:64px; background: #006cb5; color: white;" | Position
! style="width:200px; background: #006cb5; color: white;" | Name
! style="width:84px; background: #006cb5; color: white;" | Liga I
! style="width:84px; background: #006cb5; color: white;" | Cupa României
! style="width:84px; background: #006cb5; color: white;" | Cupa Ligii
! style="width:84px; background: #006cb5; color: white;" | Total
|-
| rowspan="1" | 1
| align=center| FW
| align=left|  Tha'er Bawab
| 9
| - 
| - 
| 9
|-
| rowspan="1" | 2
| align=center| MF
| align=left|  Nuno Rocha
| 8
| - 
| - 
| 8
|-
| rowspan="1" | 3
| align=center| MF
| align=left|  Pablo Brandán
| 4
| - 
| - 
| 4
|-
| rowspan="4" | 4
| align=center| MF
| align=left|  Ionuț Tîrnăcop
| 3
| - 
| - 
| 3
|-
| align=center| MF
| align=left|  Alexandru Băluță
| 2
| 1
| - 
| 3
|-
| align=center| FW
| align=left|  Costin Curelea
| 3
| - 
| - 
| 3
|-
| align=center| FW
| align=left|  Andrei Hergheligiu
| 3
| - 
| - 
| 3
|-
| rowspan="2" | 8
| align=center| MF
| align=left|  Alexandru Mateiu
| 1
| 1
| - 
| 2
|-
| align=center| MF
| align=left|  Viorel Ferfelea
| 1
| 1
| - 
| 2
|-
| rowspan="4" | 10
| align=center| FW
| align=left|  Andrei Ivan
| 1
| - 
| - 
| 1
|-
| align=center| DF
| align=left|  Nicușor Bancu
| 1
| - 
| - 
| 1
|-
| align=center| DF
| align=left|  Bogdan Vătăjelu
| 1
| - 
| - 
| 1
|-
| align=center| DF
| align=left|  Madson
| 1
| - 
| - 
| 1
|-
! colspan="3" | Total
! 38
! 3
! 0
! 41
|-

Goal minutes

Source: Competitive matches

Clean sheets

{| class="wikitable" style="text-align:center;"
|-
! style="width:56px; background: #006cb5; color: white;" | Rank
! style="width:200px; background: #006cb5; color: white;" | Name
! style="width:84px; background: #006cb5; color: white;" | Liga I
! style="width:84px; background: #006cb5; color: white;" | Cupa României
! style="width:84px; background: #006cb5; color: white;" | Cupa Ligii
! style="width:84px; background: #006cb5; color: white;" | Total
! style="width:84px; background: #006cb5; color: white;" | Games played
|-
| rowspan="1" | 1
| align=left|  Cristian Bălgrădean
| 13
| - 
| - 
| 13
| 29
|-
| rowspan="3" | 2
| align=left|  Bojan Brać
| - 
| - 
| - 
| 0
| 5
|-
| align=left|  Ionuț Irimia
| - 
| - 
| - 
| 0
| 1
|-
| align=left|  Cătălin Straton
| - 
| - 
| - 
| 0
| 3
|-
! colspan="2" | Total
! 13
! 0
! 0
! 13
! 38
|-

Disciplinary record

{| class="wikitable sortable" style="text-align:center;"
! rowspan="2" style="width:30px; background: #006cb5; color: white;" | 
! rowspan="2" style="width:30px; background: #006cb5; color: white;" | 
! rowspan="2" style="width:30px; background: #006cb5; color: white;" | 
! rowspan="2" style="width:250px; background: #006cb5; color: white;" | Name
! colspan="3" style="width:90px; background: #006cb5; color: white;" | Liga I
! colspan="3" style="width:90px; background: #006cb5; color: white;" | Cupa României
! colspan="3" style="width:90px; background: #006cb5; color: white;" | Cupa Ligii
! colspan="3" style="width:90px; background: #006cb5; color: white;" | Total
! rowspan="2" style="width:30px; background: #006cb5; color: white;" | Notes
|-
! style="width:30px;" | 
! style="width:30px;" | 
! style="width:30px;" | 
! style="width:30px;" | 
! style="width:30px;" | 
! style="width:30px;" | 
! style="width:30px;" | 
! style="width:30px;" | 
! style="width:30px;" | 
! style="width:30px;" | 
! style="width:30px;" | 
! style="width:30px;" | 
|-
| align=center|28
| align=center|DF
| align=center| 
| align=left| Madson
| align=center| 11
| align=center| -
| align=center| -
| align=center| -
| align=center| -
| align=center| -
| align=center| 1
| align=center| -
| align=center| -
| align=center| 12
| align=center| -
| align=center| -
| align=center| 
|-
| align=center|14
| align=center|MF
| align=center| 
| align=left| Pablo Brandán
| align=center| 6
| align=center| 2
| align=center| 1
| align=center| 1
| align=center| -
| align=center| -
| align=center| -
| align=center| -
| align=center| -
| align=center| 7
| align=center| 2
| align=center| 1
| align=center| 
|-
| align=center|6
| align=center|DF
| align=center| 
| align=left| Kay
| align=center| 4
| align=center| -
| align=center| 1
| align=center| -
| align=center| -
| align=center| -
| align=center| 1
| align=center| -
| align=center| -
| align=center| 5
| align=center| -
| align=center| 1
| align=center| 
|-
| align=center|5
| align=center|DF
| align=center| 
| align=left| Bogdan Vătăjelu
| align=center| 6
| align=center| -
| align=center| -
| align=center| -
| align=center| -
| align=center| -
| align=center| -
| align=center| -
| align=center| -
| align=center| 6
| align=center| -
| align=center| -
| align=center| 
|-
| align=center|13
| align=center|MF
| align=center| 
| align=left| Alexandru Băluță
| align=center| 5
| align=center| -
| align=center| -
| align=center| 1
| align=center| -
| align=center| -
| align=center| -
| align=center| -
| align=center| -
| align=center| 6
| align=center| -
| align=center| -
| align=center| 
|-
| align=center|8
| align=center|MF
| align=center| 
| align=left| Alexandru Mateiu
| align=center| 4
| align=center| -
| align=center| -
| align=center| -
| align=center| -
| align=center| -
| align=center| 1
| align=center| -
| align=center| -
| align=center| 5
| align=center| -
| align=center| -
| align=center| 
|-
| align=center|15
| align=center|MF
| align=center| 
| align=left| Nuno Rocha
| align=center| 5
| align=center| -
| align=center| -
| align=center| -
| align=center| -
| align=center| -
| align=center| -
| align=center| -
| align=center| -
| align=center| 5
| align=center| -
| align=center| -
| align=center| 
|-
| align=center|34
| align=center|GK
| align=center| 
| align=left| Cristian Bălgrădean
| align=center| 4
| align=center| -
| align=center| -
| align=center| -
| align=center| -
| align=center| -
| align=center| -
| align=center| -
| align=center| -
| align=center| 4
| align=center| -
| align=center| -
| align=center| 
|-
| align=center|4
| align=center|DF
| align=center| 
| align=left| Cosmin Frăsinescu
| align=center| 3
| align=center| -
| align=center| -
| align=center| -
| align=center| -
| align=center| -
| align=center| 1
| align=center| -
| align=center| -
| align=center| 4
| align=center| -
| align=center| -
| align=center| 
|-
| align=center|11
| align=center|FW
| align=center| 
| align=left| Tha'er Bawab
| align=center| 4
| align=center| -
| align=center| -
| align=center| -
| align=center| -
| align=center| -
| align=center| -
| align=center| -
| align=center| -
| align=center| 4
| align=center| -
| align=center| -
| align=center| 
|-
| align=center|24
| align=center|MF
| align=center| 
| align=left| Ionuț Tîrnăcop
| align=center| 4
| align=center| -
| align=center| -
| align=center| -
| align=center| -
| align=center| -
| align=center| -
| align=center| -
| align=center| -
| align=center| 4
| align=center| -
| align=center| -
| align=center| 
|-
| align=center|2
| align=center|DF
| align=center| 
| align=left| Sebastian Achim
| align=center| 4
| align=center| -
| align=center| -
| align=center| -
| align=center| -
| align=center| -
| align=center| -
| align=center| -
| align=center| -
| align=center| 4
| align=center| -
| align=center| -
| align=center| 
|-
| align=center|18
| align=center|DF
| align=center| 
| align=left| Ovidiu Dănănae
| align=center| -
| align=center| -
| align=center| -
| align=center| -
| align=center| -
| align=center| -
| align=center| 1
| align=center| 1
| align=center| -
| align=center| 1
| align=center| 1
| align=center| -
| align=center| 
|-
| align=center|30
| align=center|MF
| align=center| 
| align=left| Silviu Izvoranu
| align=center| 2
| align=center| -
| align=center| -
| align=center| -
| align=center| -
| align=center| -
| align=center| -
| align=center| -
| align=center| -
| align=center| 2
| align=center| -
| align=center| -
| align=center| 
|-
| align=center|4
| align=center|FW
| align=center| 
| align=left| Costin Curelea
| align=center| 1
| align=center| -
| align=center| -
| align=center| 1
| align=center| -
| align=center| -
| align=center| -
| align=center| -
| align=center| -
| align=center| 2
| align=center| -
| align=center| -
| align=center| 
|-
| align=center|27
| align=center|DF
| align=center| 
| align=left| Nicușor Bancu
| align=center| 1
| align=center| -
| align=center| -
| align=center| -
| align=center| -
| align=center| -
| align=center| -
| align=center| -
| align=center| -
| align=center| 1
| align=center| -
| align=center| -
| align=center| 
|-
| align=center|40
| align=center|MF
| align=center| 
| align=left| Dacian Varga
| align=center| 1
| align=center| -
| align=center| -
| align=center| -
| align=center| -
| align=center| -
| align=center| -
| align=center| -
| align=center| -
| align=center| 1
| align=center| -
| align=center| -
| align=center| 
|-
| align=center|1
| align=center|GK
| align=center| 
| align=left| Bojan Brać
| align=center| 1
| align=center| -
| align=center| -
| align=center| -
| align=center| -
| align=center| -
| align=center| -
| align=center| -
| align=center| -
| align=center| 1
| align=center| -
| align=center| -
| align=center| 
|-
| align=center|3
| align=center|DF
| align=center| 
| align=left| Stephane Acka
| align=center| 1
| align=center| -
| align=center| -
| align=center| -
| align=center| -
| align=center| -
| align=center| -
| align=center| -
| align=center| -
| align=center| 1
| align=center| -
| align=center| -
| align=center| 
|-
! colspan="4" | Total
! 67
! 2
! 2
! 3
! 0
! 0
! 5
! 1
! 0
! 75
! 3
! 2
! 
|-

Attendances

{|class="wikitable" style="text-align: center;"
|-
! style="background: #006cb5; color: white;"|
! style="width:70px; background: #006cb5; color: white;"|
! style="width:70px; background: #006cb5; color: white;"|
! style="width:70px; background: #006cb5; color: white;"|
! style="width:70px; background: #006cb5; color: white;"|
! style="width:70px; background: #006cb5; color: white;"|
|-
|align=left|Liga I||17||97,000||5,705||14,000||1,000
|-
|align=left|Cupa României||2||28,500||14,250||25,000||3,500
|-
|align=left|Cupa Ligii||0||0||0||0||0
|- bgcolor="#EFEFEF"
|-
|Total||19||125,500||6,605||25,000||1,000

See also

 2014–15 Liga I
 2014–15 Cupa României
 2014–15 Cupa Ligii

References

CS Universitatea Craiova seasons
Universitatea, Craiova, CS